Agrupación Deportiva Alcorcón S.A.D. is a Spanish football team based in Alcorcón, in the autonomous community of Madrid. Founded in 1971, it currently plays in Primera Federación – Group 1, holding home matches at the Municipal de Santo Domingo, with a 5,100 seat capacity.

History 
Founded in 1971 by Dionisio Muñoz Jerez. The founding act of the club was signed on 20 July that year. Alcorcón spent roughly its first 30 years of existence in between the fourth division and the regional leagues. Alcorcón played its first match on 8 September 1971 against Atlético Madrid (youth team) and lost it 0:2. In 2000–01, it made its Segunda División B debut, finishing in 12th place, and spending the following seasons immersed in mid-table positions. The 2003–04 season Alcolcórn led by coach Raúl González finished in 10th position in Segunda División B.

In 2008–09, a third place in the regular season meant Alcorcón was allowed to appear in the promotion play-offs for the first time in its history. After disposing of Sant Andreu and Alcoyano, the club was ousted by Real Unión of Irun in the final round with a 3–1 aggregate scoreline.

2009–10 Copa del Rey 

On 27 October 2009, Alcorcón secured the most famous victory in its history after it defeated La Liga powerhouse Real Madrid 4–0 at home in the first leg of its round-of-32 match in the Copa del Rey. In the club's first ever official match against a team from the top flight, its opponent fielded nine international players in its starting eleven: Jerzy Dudek, Álvaro Arbeloa, Raúl Albiol, Christoph Metzelder, Royston Drenthe, Mahamadou Diarra, Guti, Esteban Granero, Raúl, Rafael van der Vaart and Karim Benzema, with Ruud van Nistelrooy, Fernando Gago and Marcelo appearing as substitutes in the second-half.

On 10 November, in the second leg at the Santiago Bernabéu, the club lost 1–0, but won 4–1 on aggregate, thereby going through to the next round of 16, where the club was ousted by Racing de Santander, 2–3 on aggregate.

2010–present 
Following the Alcorconazo, in the 2009–10 season, Alcorcón was finally promoted to level two after defeating Pontevedra (3–0 on aggregate) and Ontinyent (4–3 on aggregate) in the promotion play-offs. In the second tier, the club played twice the promotion play-offs but were defeated by Real Valladolid in the final of the 2012 edition and by Girona in the semi-finals of the 2013 edition.

In 2017, Alcorcón qualified to the Copa del Rey quarter-finals for the first time in their history after a penalty shoot-out victory over Espanyol, but were beaten 2–0 on aggregate by Alavés. The club was 13th in the 2017–18 season in the Segunda División, just 4 points away from being relegated, and also struggled in the next campaign, but retained its place in Segunda División after finishing the season in the 14th position.

On 16 April 2022, Alcorcon was relegated to third division after defeated by Cartagena, ending their 12 years stay in second division.

In 2023, AD Alcorcón signed a sponsorship deal with Hacksaw Gaming for the 2022/2023 season. After a hard-fought 1-0 win over FC Talavera in February 2023, the football club currently sits on top of their division by two points over their rivals Real Madrid Castilla.

Season to season

12 seasons in Segunda División
1 season in Primera División RFEF
10 seasons in Segunda División B
15 seasons in Tercera División
14 seasons in Categorías Regionales

Current squad
.

Reserve team

Out on loan

Current technical staff

 Titi

Notable coaches

 José Díaz
 Raúl González
 Juan Antonio Anquela
 José Bordalás
 Julio Velázquez

Reserve team
AD Alcorcón B

References

External links
Official website 
Futbolme team profile 
BDFutbol team profile
Unofficial forum 

 
Segunda División clubs
Football clubs in the Community of Madrid
Association football clubs established in 1971
1971 establishments in Spain
Sport in Alcorcón
Primera Federación clubs
Football clubs in Spain